Vardarac is a settlement in the region of Baranja, Croatia. Administratively, it is located in the Bilje municipality within the Osijek-Baranja County. Population is 630 people.

See also
Osijek-Baranja County
Baranja

References

Populated places in Osijek-Baranja County
Baranya (region)